Aksu Prefecture is located in mid-Western Xinjiang, People's Republic of China. The name Aksu is Turkic for 'white water'.

Etymology
The name Aksu comes from the name of the Aksu River which is Turkic for 'white water'. The name is similar to that of the nearby Zhetysu region which means "seven rivers". The name of Aksu Prefecture's Onsu County (Wensu) means "ten water" in Uyghur and other Turkic languages, and 'Kizilsu' in Kizilsu Kyrgyz Autonomous Prefecture means 'red water'- all of these names consist of a descriptor followed by 'su' (river; water).

History
In 717 AD, the Arabs, guided by their Turgesh allies, besieged Buat-ɦuɑn (Aksu) and Dai-dʑiᴇk-dʑiᴇŋ (Uqturpan) in the Battle of Aksu.

During the COVID-19 pandemic in mainland China, 214 Uyghur workers were sent to Jiujiang, Jiangxi.

Geography
The prefecture occupies the northwestern part of the Tarim Basin and the southern slopes of the Tian Shan. The southern part of the prefecture is within the Taklamakan desert. Agriculture is only possible in the areas irrigated by the Tarim River and its glacier-fed tributaries, the Aksu River and the Muzart River. Aksu Prefecture surrounds Aral, Xinjiang.

Administrative divisions 
Aksu Prefecture is divided into 2 county-level cities and 8 counties:

Demographics 
As of 2015, 2,030,600 (80.2%) of the 2,530,506 residents of the county were Uyghur, 465,983 (18.4%) were Han Chinese and 33,923 were from other ethnic groups.

As of 1999, 75.0% of the population of Aksu (Aqsu, Akesu) Prefecture was Uyghur and 23.7% of the population was Han Chinese.

References

 
Prefecture-level divisions of Xinjiang